Chak Amru railway station is a northern terminus serving Chak Amru town, Narowal district, Punjab, Pakistan.

It is the most easterly active station in the undisputed-borders part (bulk) of the country.

See also
 List of railway stations in Pakistan
 Pakistan Railways

References

External links

Railway stations in Narowal district
Railway stations on Shahdara Bagh–Chak Amru Branch Line